Ihu Airport  is an airfield serving Ihu, in the Gulf Province of Papua New Guinea.

References

External links
 

Airports in Papua New Guinea
Gulf Province